Erwin Groves "Murph" Chamberlain (February 14, 1915 in Shawville, Quebec – May 8, 1986) was a Canadian ice hockey centre who played in the National Hockey League for the Toronto Maple Leafs, Montreal Canadiens, Brooklyn Americans and Boston Bruins between 1937 and 1949. He won the Stanley Cup twice, in 1944 and 1946, both with Montreal.

Playing career before NHL
Chamberlain, whose first name was spelled "Irwin" in his hometown newspaper, reportedly began his hockey career in Shawville, PQ. He was reportedly added to the Toronto Maple Leafs reserve list by 1937 after steadily improving his game while playing in Northern Ontario. In April 1937 he scored 4 goals and 2 goals respectively for the Sudbury Tigers in a two-game Eastern Canada senior amateur hockey finals against the Hull Volants. The Tigers won the first game in Ottawa 9–4 in front of a "record-breaking" crowd before winning the second game in Toronto 14–2. 

The Sudbury Tigers then travelled to Calgary, Alberta to play for the Allan Cup against the Western Canada senior champs, the North Battleford Beavers. Sudbury won the 5 game series 3 games to 2.

As the Allan Cup champions, the Sudbury Tigers earned a berth in the one and only Toronto International Tournament in April, 1937 which pitted them against the English National League champs (Wembley Lions), the USA Amateur Champions (Hershey Bears) and the Memorial Cup Champs (Winnipeg Monarchs). The Sudbury Tigers scored a sudden-death in the third game of a 3-game final against the Wembley Lions to win the tournament. The tournament was hampered by controversies and low crowds so was not continued in following years.

NHL Playing career
Chamberlain began his NHL Career with the Toronto Maple Leafs in 1938. He played for them until the end of the 1940 season. The next year, he played for the Montreal Canadiens. In 1942, he spent time in the AHL with the Washington Lions. Later that season, he was called back to Montreal and then traded to the Brooklyn Americans. He spent the 1943 season with the Boston Bruins. After that season he returned to Montreal for the final six seasons of his career. He won the Stanley Cup twice with Montreal, in 1944 and 1946. He retired from hockey after the 1949 season.

Coaching career
Chamberlain was head coach of the Sudbury Wolves of the EPHL for two seasons 1960–61 and 1962–63.

Career statistics

Regular season and playoffs

Achievements
1936–37 Allan Cup Champion (Sudbury Tigers)
1944 Stanley Cup Champion (Montreal)
1946 Stanley Cup Champion (Montreal)

References

External links

Erwin Chamberlain's Name on the 1946 Stanley Cup Plaque

1915 births
1986 deaths
Boston Bruins players
Brooklyn Americans players
Canadian ice hockey centres
Montreal Canadiens players
People from Outaouais
Springfield Indians players
Stanley Cup champions
Toronto Maple Leafs players